Missy or Missie is a feminine first name, often a short form of Melissa.

People 
 Mathilde de Morny (1863-1944), French aristocrat and artist
Michele "Missy" Avila (1968-1985), American murder victim
 Missie Berteotti (born 1963), American LPGA golfer
 Missy Booth, fictional character from the television series Ackley Bridge
 Missy Cummings, Associate Professor of Aeronautics and Astronautics at the Massachusetts Institute of Technology and former U.S. Navy fighter pilot
 Missy Elliott (born 1971), American rapper, singer, songwriter and record producer
 Missy Giove (born 1972), American former professional mountain bike rider
 Missy Gold (born 1970), American former child actress
 Missy Franklin (born 1995), American competitive swimmer
 Missy Higgins (born 1983), Australian singer and songwriter
 Missy Hyatt (born 1963), American professional wrestling valet
 Missy LeHand (1898–1944), longtime private secretary to U.S. President Franklin D. Roosevelt 
 Missy Malone, British burlesque performer
 Missy Mazzoli (born 1980), American composer and pianist
 Missie McGeorge (born 1959), American LPGA golfer
 Missy Peregrym, Canadian actress
 Missy Raines (born 1962), American bluegrass bassist
 Missy Robbins (born 1971), American chef
 Missy Schwen-Ryan (born 1972), American rower

Characters 
 Missy, a character in the 1991 American comedy-drama movie Fried Green Tomatoes
 Missy (short for The Mistress), a female incarnation of the villain The Master from the British science fiction series Doctor Who
 Missy Armitage, in the 2017 film Get Out
 Missy, character in The Fairly OddParents
 Missy, a cat who was missing in the epic 2010 Shannon production Missing Missy
 Missy Cooper, a character in the Young Sheldon

See also
 Missi Pyle, American actress

Feminine given names
Hypocorisms